Felix Liebermann (20 July 1851 – 7 October 1925) was a Jewish German historian, who is celebrated for his scholarly contributions to the study of medieval English history, particularly that of Anglo-Saxon and Anglo-Norman law.

Born in 1851, Berlin, he came from a Jewish-German family and was the younger brother of the painter Max Liebermann. Having first pursued a business career in banking and textile industry and having lived for some time in Manchester, he moved to Göttingen, Germany, in 1873 to study early English history, with Georg Waitz and Reinhold Pauli as his mentors. After his promotion on the Dialogus de scaccario ("Dialogue of the Exchequer") in 1875, he rapidly earned a name for himself as a medieval historian. In 1896, he received honorary degrees from the universities of Oxford and Cambridge and later, the title of professor of history from the Prussian minister of justice Robert Bosse. He died in a car accident in Berlin, 1925.

Bibliography

Selected works by Liebermann
1875. Dialogus de scaccario. Dissertation.
1879. Ungedruckte anglo-normannische Geschichtsquellen. Strasbourg.
1889. Die Heiligen Englands: Angelsächsisch und lateinisch. Available from Google Books
1892. Quadripartitus. Ein englisches Rechtsbuch von 1114. Halle. PDF available from Google Books, here and here (US only) and from the Internet Archive here
1893. Consiliatio Cnuti. Eine Übertragung angelsächsischer Gesetze aus dem zwölften Jahrhundert. Halle.
1894. Über Pseudo-Cnuts Constitutiones de foresta. Halle.
1894. Über die Leges Anglorum saeculo XIII, ineunte Londoniis collectae. Halle.
1896. Über die Leges Edwardi Confessoris. Halle.
1901. Über das englische rechtsbuch Leges Henrici. PDF available from the Internet Archive
1903-1916. Gesetze der Angelsachsen. 3 vols. Halle. Standard edition, translation, dictionary and glossary of the corpus of Anglo-Saxon laws. Available from the Internet Archive:
vol. 1 (edition and translation)
vol. 2. Or separately, first half (dictionary) and second half (glossary)
vol. 3 (commentary)
1913. The national assembly in the Anglo-Saxon period. Halle. Internet Archive

Biographies and obituaries
Dammery, Richard J. "Editing the Anglo-Saxon Laws: Felix Liebermann and Beyond." The Editing of Old English, ed. D. G. Scragg and Paul E. Szarmach. Cambridge, 1994. pp. 251–61.
Davis, H.W.C. "Felix Liebermann." English Historical Review 41 (1926). 91 ff.
Hazeltine, H. D. "Felix Liebermann, 1851-1925." Proceedings of the British Academy 24 (1938): 319–60.
Heymann, Ernst. "Felix Liebermann." Zeitschrift der Savigny-Stiftung für Rechtsgeschichte, Germanistische Abteilung 46 (1926): xxiii-xxxix.
Tout, Thomas Frederick. "Felix Liebermann (1851-1925)." History NS 10 (1926): 311–19.
Scheer, Regina. Wir sind die Liebermanns. Die Geschichte einer Familie. Berlin: Propyläen, 2006. .

External links
 
Portrait

19th-century German historians
Legal historians
19th-century German Jews
Jewish historians
1851 births
1925 deaths
Anglo-Saxon studies scholars
German male non-fiction writers
Road incident deaths in Germany
Fellows of the Royal Historical Society
Corresponding Fellows of the British Academy